Brendan Evans and Scott Oudsema were the defending champions, but did not compete in the Juniors in this year.

Alex Clayton and Donald Young won in the final 7–6(7–3), 4–6, 7–5, against Carsten Ball and Thiemo de Bakker.

Seeds

Draw

Finals

Top half

Bottom half

External links
Draw

Boys' Doubles
US Open, 2005 Boys' Doubles